The Pavillon des Arts was a museum located in the 1st arrondissement of Paris at Les Halles, 101, rue Rambuteau, Paris, France. According to an article in Evene.fr, the museum closed in 2006.

The museum was established in 1983 in a contemporary glass and steel building within Les Halles. Its exhibition space was devoted to temporary exhibits of photography, painting, sculpture, archaeology, objets d'art, jewellery, costumes, textiles, furniture, books, medals, and so forth.

See also 
 List of museums in Paris

References 
 Pavillon des Arts
 Paris.org entry
 Museums in Paris entry
 Museums of Paris entry 
 Evene.fr article 

Defunct museums in Paris
Museums disestablished in 2006